The 2021 LA Galaxy season was the club's 26th season of existence, and their 26th in Major League Soccer, the top-tier of the American soccer pyramid. LA Galaxy played its home matches at the stadium Dignity Health Sports Park in the LA suburb of Carson, California. The Galaxy attempted to make the playoffs after failing to qualify in 2020, but were ultimately unsuccessful.

Management team

Players

Squad information

Transfers

Transfers in

Draft picks 

Draft picks are not automatically signed to the team roster. Only those who are signed to a contract will be listed as transfers in.

Transfers out

Competitions

Preseason 
The first preseason games were announced on March 5, 2021.

Major League Soccer

Standings

Overall

Western Conference

Results summary

Regular season 

 

All times in Pacific Time Zone.

Awards

Hat-tricks

Player of the Month

Player / Team of the Week
Bold denotes League Player of the Week.

Statistics

Appearances and goals

|-
|}

See also 
 2021 in American soccer
 2021 LA Galaxy II season

References 

Galaxy
LA Galaxy
LA Galaxy
LA Galaxy
LA Galaxy seasons